Murhesi Rampur railway station is a small railway station in Mathura district, Uttar Pradesh. Its code is AME. It serves Mathura city. The station consists of two platforms. The platforms are not well sheltered. It lacks many facilities including water and sanitation.

Trains 

Some of the trains that runs from Murhesi Rampur are:

 Mathura–Ratlam Passenger (unreserved)
 Mathura–Bayana Passenger (unreserved)
 Sawai–Madhopur–Mathura Passenger (unreserved)

References

Railway stations in Mathura district
Kota railway division